Poliyoorkurchy is a small village in India located  before Thuckalay if traveling from Nagercoil towards Martandam (the last stop in Kanyakumari District on the  Tamil Nadu-Kerala border).

The main crops are rice, plantain, and coconut palm.

It has a fort called the Udayagiri named after the King Udayanan of the Padmanabhapuram. This fort was the camping and training ground for the king’s army. Some remains of the furnace used for making ammunition can still be seen. Today the fort is a natural park with a tree house, herbal garden, deer and bird enclosures, and an aquarium.

There are two streets of Brahmin Dwellings in this village. They are called Single Street, consist of single row houses, and Double Street consist of Double row of houses. There is a Ganesh Temple with Sivaalayam built within one compound in the Single Street. The Koil is called Pillayaar Koil. The speciality of this Pillayaar Koil is that people connected or even outsiders come and pray for their wishes. Most of the wishes are fulfilled and in return people offer 1008 " Kozhakattai" (Mothakam) made of poor am covered by rice flower. Almost 200 days in a year some one or other invariable of caste, or Religion offer the thanks giving to this Ganesh. Once this Gramam was having enough properties to look after the temple, but now it depends on devotees contribution. The Siva temple in the same compound is maintained by Govt. of Tamil Nadu.

In double street there is a Ramar Koil, where regular Bhajans were held. All Hindu celebrations are performed in the village cost. But now since village properties was eradicated the celebration are held in a very small way.

This village is adjacent to Udayagiri Fort. This village perform village "Padukkai" to Melankode Amman Koil every year, as the villager's feel that Melankode is their Kaval Theivam. 
This village is one of the shortcut for going to kumarakoil, Lord Murugan Koil. An engineering college is also situated near this village

Kanyakumari